Gaousso Bakayoko (born 23 June 1991) is an Ivorian footballer who currently plays for Des Moines Menace in USL League Two.

Career
Bakayoko signed with United Soccer League side Rochester Rhinos from Lehigh Valley United Sonic on 19 August 2016.

References

External links

1991 births
Living people
Ivorian footballers
Ivorian expatriate footballers
Rochester New York FC players
Association football midfielders
Expatriate soccer players in the United States
USL League Two players
USL Championship players
Des Moines Menace players
Ivorian expatriate sportspeople in the United States